James Joel Gustafson (born March 16, 1961) is a former American football wide receiver in the National Football League who played for the Minnesota Vikings. He played college football for the St. Thomas Tommies.

References

1961 births
Living people
American football wide receivers
Cincinnati Bengals players
Minnesota Vikings players
Ed Block Courage Award recipients